Alan John Geoghegan (born 14 March 1978) is an Irish hurler who played as a left wing-forward for the Kilkenny senior team.

Geoghegan joined the team during the 2001 National League and was a regular member of the team for just three seasons. During that time he won one Leinster winners' medal on the field of play.

At club level Geoghegan is a two-time Leinster medalist with O'Loughlin Gaels. In addition to this he has also won three county club championship medals.

References

1978 births
Living people
O'Loughlin Gaels hurlers
Kilkenny inter-county hurlers